Sergio Estebán Bica Suárez (born 13 June 1983) is an Uruguayan footballer who currently plays as defender for Marathón.

References

1983 births
Living people
People from Tacuarembó
Uruguayan footballers
Association football defenders
Tacuarembó F.C. players
Club Atlético River Plate (Montevideo) players
Real C.D. España players
C.D. Marathón players
Argentine Primera División players
Liga Nacional de Fútbol Profesional de Honduras players
Uruguayan expatriate footballers
Expatriate footballers in Honduras
Expatriate footballers in Argentina